Chaabi ( in Arabic), also known as Chaâbi, Sha-bii, or Sha'bii meaning "folk", refers to different music genres in  North Africa and the Middle East such as Algerian chaabi, Moroccan chaabi and Egyptian Shaabi.

Chaabi music just means 'music of the people' that's why it's often found in weddings and local celebrations, and these styles are often associated with festivals.

Popular artists 

 Hakim
 Hassan El Asmar
 Bahaa Sultan
 Hicham.Bajit
 Jedwan
 Yassin Bounous
 Daoudi Abdellah
 Saïd Senhaji
 El Hadj M'Hamed El Anka
 El Hachemi Guerouabi
 Amar Ezzahi
 Dahmane El Harrachi
 Kamel Messaoudi
 Hamada Helal
 Bab L' Bluz

External links 
 Hicham.Bajit 
 MaghrebSpace
 nachattube
 dailyzik
 NYTimes feature

North African music
Middle Eastern music

fr:Chaâbi algérois